Bianor is a genus of spider.

Bianor (gen.: Βιάνορος) may also refer to:

Bianor, name of four mythical figures, see Bienor (mythology)
Bianor (poet), a Roman-era Greek poet

See also
Bienor (disambiguation)